Dr Shalu Vashistha is a prominent Scientist in the field of chemistry and biology. She has several publications in national and international journals.

Her publication in the International Journal of Polymer Material and International Book Publication Chapter 16 Cellulose Nanofibers Reinforced Bioplastics and Their Applications (pages 452–470) in Handbook of Bio Plastics and Bio polymer. She specialization in biochemistry and clinical research.

Book Publication
Shalu Vashistha, B.S. Kaith and Susheel Kalia Handbook of Bioplastics and Biocomposites Engineering Applications

Editor(s): Srikanth Pilla Chapter 16 Cellulose Nanofibers Reinforced Bioplastics and Their Applications (pages 452–470)

Published Online: 19 SEP 2011 09:03 EST

Print  Online  DOI: 10.1002/9781118203699

International & National Publications
 Susheel Kalia, Shalu Vashistha Surface Modification of Sisal Fibers (Agave sisalana) Using Bacterial Cellulase and Methyl Methacrylate, Journal of Polymers and the Environment DOI: 10.1007/s10924-011-0363-8
 Renu Sheoran, Shalu Vashistha and Susheel Kalia, Biologically and chemically modification of ramie fibers: A comparative study International Conference on Advances in Polymer Technology, Feb. 26-27, 2010, India, Page No. 238
 Shalu Vashistha, Renu Sheoran, and Susheel Kalia Deposition of nanosized bacterial cellulose on to sisal fiber International Conference on Advances in Polymer Technology, Feb. 26-27, 2010, India,
 Vijay K. Kaushik, Anil Kumar, Shalu Vashistha and Susheel Kalia:   Effect of Chemical treatments on the morphology, structure and properties of Sisal fibers, International Conference on Advances in Polymer Technology, Feb. 26-27, 2010, India, Cochin, Kerala (India).
  Shalu Vashistha and priyanka Yadav, Biochemical Modification of Sisal Fibers (Agave sisalina) using Bacteria (Brevibacillus parabrevis) and poly(MMA) National conference “Green Chemistry- Safer chemistry “ to be organized by the Department of Chemistry, Govt. R. R. PG Autonomous College, Alwar (Raj.) on Sept. 23–24, 2011.
 Shalu Vashistha, Renu Sheoran and Susheel Kalia: Biological and Chemical Modification of Sisal Fiber: A study of Morphology, Crystallinity and Thermal Behavior, National Seminar on Analytical Sciences in Energy and Environment, Indian Institute of Petroleum, Dehradun, November 19–20, 2009.
 Susheel Kalia, Shalu Vashistha, and Rajesh K. Sharma, Bio- and chemical modification of sisal fibers using Brevibacillus parabrevis and methyl methacrylate, Proceedings of National Conference on Polymer Science & Engineering: Emerging dimensions (PSE-2010), UICET, Panjab University Chandigarh, November 26–27, 2010.
 Shalu Vashistha and Heena Sehgal, Deposition of Nanocellulose and poly(MMA) onto Ramie Fibers (Boehmeria nivea) using Bacteria (Streptomyces albaduncus) and Methyl methacrylate National conference “Green Chemistry- Safer chemistry “ to be organized by the Department of Chemistry, Govt. R. R. PG Autonomous College, Alwar (Raj.) on Sept. 23–24, 2011.
 Shalu Vashistha and priyanka Yadav, Biochemical Modification of Sisal Fibers (Agave sisalina) using Bacteria (Brevibacillus parabrevis) and poly(MMA) National conference “Green Chemistry- Safer chemistry “ to be organized by the Department of Chemistry, Govt. R. R. PG Autonomous College, Alwar (Raj.) on Sept. 23–24, 2011.
 Shalu Vashistha and Ijeoma ekeledo Rachel Cellulase enzyme assisted biopolishing and microwave assisted grafting of Sisal fibers (Agave sisalana) for use in biocomposite materials. ) National conference “Green Chemistry- Safer chemistry “ to be organized by the Department of Chemistry, Govt. R. R. PG Autonomous College, Alwar (Raj.) on Sept. 23–24, 2011.
 Shalu Vashistha and Piyush Sharma, Role of Resveratrol in treatment of cancer National Level Conference on Natural products in healthcare to be organized by gurunanak college of pharmacy, Nagpur(Maharastha) on 24-26 nov 2011 
 Shalu Vashistha and Ijeoma ekeledo Rachel Role of Artemisinin in treatment of Malaria National Level Conference on Natural products in healthcare to be organized by gurunanak college of pharmacy, Nagpur(Maharastha) on 24-26 nov 2011
 Susheel Kalia, and Shalu Vashistha, Bacterial and Chemical Modification of Sisal fibers using Brevibacillus parabrevis and Methyl methacrylate: A Comparative Study, Arbian Journal of Chemistry, Under Review.
 Susheel Kalia, Shalu Vashistha, and Renu Sheoran, Cellulase enzyme assisted biopolishing and microwave assisted grafting onto sisal fibers, Express Polym. Lett., under review.
 Susheel Kalia, Renu Sheoran and Shalu Vashistha, Microwave assisted binary vinyl monomer graft copolymerization and cellulase enzyme assisted biopolishing of ramie fibers  (Boehmeria nivea), Cellulose, 2011, in press
 Susheel Kalia and Shalu Vashistha, Enzymatic and Chemical Modification of sisal fibers (Agave sisalana) using Brevibacillus parabrevis bacteria and Methyl methacrylate monomer, National Conference on Recent Trends in Materials Science, Jaypee University of Information Technology, 08-10 October 2011. 
 Susheel Kalia and Shalu Vashistha, Morphology, Crystallinity and Thermal Stability of Sisal Fibers (Agave sisalana) Treated with Brevibacillus parabrevis Bacteria and Methyl methacrylate Monomer, National Workshop cum Seminar on Advances in Electron Microscopy & Allied Fields (NWAEMA-2011), September 23–29, 2011" Shoolini University of Biotechnology & Management Sciences, Solan.
 Shalu Vashistha and Susheel Kalia, Bio and chemical Modification of sisal fibers using cellulase enzyme and methyl methacrylate monomer, Conference on ‘Advanced Polymers, Fibers and Fabrics’ (APF2-2011), December 26–28, 2011 at DMSRDE, Kanpur. 
 Shalu Vashistha and Susheel Kalia, Pre-treatments of Sisal Fibers for Preparation of Sisal-Polyhydroxybutyrate Composites with Enhanced Mechanical Properties, National Seminar on “Frontiers in Polymer Science”, 18–19 November 2011, Department of Chemistry, H.P. University, Shimla, India.
 Shalu Vashistha, Renu Sheoran, Susheel Kalia, and B.S. Kaith, Effect of Bacterial Cellulase Treatment on Morphology, Crystallinity and Thermal Stability of Ramie and Sisal Fibers, APA International Congress on Advances in Human Healthcare Systems, “Healthcare India 2012”, February 20–23, 2012, New Delhi, India.
 Susheel Kalia and Shalu Vashistha, Surface Modification of Biofibers using Chemical and Environment Benevolent Methods: A Comparative Study, 2nd National Conference on Recent Advances in Chemistry and their Impact on Environment (NCRACE-2012), February 4–5, 2012, Arya Post Graduate College, Panipat, India. 
 Shalu Vashistha and Susheel Kalia, Effect of Bacterial Cellulase Treatment and Microwave Assisted Grafting of Poly(MMA) on some Properties of Sisal Fibers (Agave sisalana), 2nd National Conference on Recent Advances in Chemistry and their Impact on Environment (NCRACE-2012), February 4–5, 2012, Arya Post Graduate College, Panipat, India.

References

Year of birth missing (living people)
Living people
Indian biologists
Indian chemists